Veranilda: A Romance is a posthumous novel by English author George Gissing. The book was left incomplete at the time of Gissing's death (December 28, 1903) and it was first published in 1904 by Archibald Constable and Company.

Publication
As an old friend of Gissing, H.G. Wells was asked to write an introduction to Veranilda. Displeased with the piece Wells wrote, Gissing's relatives and literary executors then asked Frederic Harrison to write a substitute. Well's rejected preface was later published under the title "George Gissing: An Impression".

Other editions
 Veranilda. New York: E.P. Dutton & Company, 1905.
 Veranilda. London: Archibald Constable and Co., 1905.
 Veranilda. London: Oxford University Press, 1929.
 Veranilda. New York: AMS Press, 1968.
 Veranilda. Brighton: The Harvester Press, 1987.

Notes

Further reading
 Barry, William (1904). "Mr. Gissing's Last Book," The Bookman, Vol. XXVII, No. 158, p. 81.
 Borg, Jacob (2001). "Gissing and Ancient Rome." In: A Garland for Gissing. Amsterdam: Rodopi, pp. 225–234.
 Faries, Randolph (1923). "Novels Written by Authors Who Have Portrayed Roman Life from an Esthetic Viewpoint." In: Ancient Rome in the English Novel. Philadelphia: Lyon & Armor, pp. 112–120.
 Gissing, Alfred G. (1937). "Gissing's Unfinished Romance," National Review, Vol. CVIII, pp. 82–91.
 Harrison, Frederic (1911). Autobiographical Memories, Vol. II. London: Macmillan & Co.

External links
 Veranilda, at Internet Archive
 Veranilda, at Project Gutenberg

1904 British novels
Novels by George Gissing
British historical novels
Novels set in the 6th century
Unfinished novels
Novels published posthumously